Agusalu is a village in Alutaguse Parish, Ida-Viru County in northeastern Estonia. It is particularly known for the Agusalu Nature Reserve which encompasses a large proportion of the area. Its landscape is characterised by large bogs and is known for hosting the only system of continental sand dunes in Estonia.

References

 

Villages in Ida-Viru County